Altamirano is a village in Valle Hermoso Municipality, Tamaulipas, Mexico. It is located at latitude 25.88333 and longitude -97.81667. It is adjacent to the village of Empalme.

References

El Poblado Ignacio Manuel Altamirano es un pequeño pueblo municipio de Valle Hermoso Tamaulipas. Los habitantes de la zona, subsisten en su mayoría en trabajos relacionados a la agricultura y ganadería. Frente a el, se encuentra el Poblado Vista Hermosa y esta muy cercano tambien, al Poblado Empalme.

Algunos de los negocios que subsisten hasta el momento en la zona son: Una farmacia veterinaria, una tortillería, tiendas de conveniencia, compra de maíz y sorgo, entre otros.

Populated places in Tamaulipas